Oxyptilus delawaricus is a moth of the family Pterophoridae. It is found in North America, including Canada, New Hampshire, Massachusetts and California.

The head, thorax and forewings are light reddish brown. The abdomen is reddish brown at the base, yellowish white beyond and indistinctly marked with whitish scales and lines.

References

Moths described in 1873
Oxyptilini